Prasophyllum mimulum, commonly known as the highland leek orchid, is a species of orchid endemic to Tasmania. It has a single tubular, green leaf and up to ten greenish-brown to purplish flowers with purple and white petals and a white labellum. It is restricted to subalpine areas of the state.

Description
There is a yellowish green callus in the centre of the labellum and extending just past the bend. Flowering occurs from January to March.

Taxonomy and naming
Prasophyllum mimulum was first formally described in 2004 by David Jones from near Lake Baillie in the Central Plateau Conservation Area of Tasmania and the description was published in The Orchadian. The specific epithet is from the Latin diminutive meaning "imitating" or "mimicking", referring to the overall similarities between this species and P. alpestre.

Distribution and habitat
The highland leek orchid grows in grassland and moorland in subalpine areas of Tasmania.

References

External links 
 

mimulum
Flora of Tasmania
Endemic orchids of Australia
Plants described in 2004